The shooting of Mohamed Bah was an incident that occurred on September 25, 2012. During the incident, Mohamed Bah age 28 was fatally shot 8 times inside his Manhattan apartment by New York City Police officers.

The incident prompted the Bah family to file a $70 million civil lawsuit against New York City. The lawsuit demanded the city implement changes in the way police deal with people suffering from a mental illness.

In 2017, the Bah family settled in court for $2.21 million. The officers were found to have used unnecessary force but did not face charges.

References

2012 deaths
Deaths by firearm in Manhattan
Deaths by person in New York City
Victims of police brutality in the United States